The Tengnoupal district of Manipur state in India is divided into 3 administrative subdivisions called blocks. It has one town (Moreh), and 263 villages.

The district was carved out of the Chandel district in 2016, and did not exist at the time of the 2011 Census of India. The following list of populated places from the 2011 census is for the Machi and Tengnoupal blocks of the former Chandel district.

Blocks 

The district has three blocks: Moreh, Tengnoupal, and Machi. At the time of the 2011 census, the Machi and Tengnoupal blocks were part of the Chandel district, and the Moreh area was part of the Tengnoupal block.

Towns 

As of 2022, Moreh is the only town in the district. At the time of the 2011 census, Moreh was a part of the Tengnoupal block of the Chandel district.

Villages

Machi block (2011)

Tengnoupal block (2011)

References 

Tengnoupal